William Bewley (1726–1783) was an English physician.

William Bewley may also refer to:

William Bewley (New York politician) (1878–1953), New York politician
William Bewley (MP), 15th-century MP from Cumberland